Tullu Dimtu (Oromo: Tulluu Diimtuu) is the fourth highest peak in Ethiopia after Ras Dashen (4550m), Ancua (4462m), and Kidus Yared (4453m). 

Tullu Dimtu is on the Sanetti Plateau in the Bale Mountains of Oromia Region in southeast Ethiopia, within Bale Mountains National Park. It forms part of the divide between the drainage basins of the Weyib and Shebelle Rivers.

A rough gravel road, the third highest in Africa, leads to the top of Tullu Dimtu.

See also
Bale National Park

References

External links
Ethiopia 2006 - Part 5 - Over Bale mountains and down to Harena forest

Tullu
Bale Mountains
Ethiopian Highlands
Geography of Oromia Region